Government Medical College, Akola is a medical college in Akola city. The attached teaching hospital - Survopchar Rugnalaya (Multispeciality hospital) was previously known as Main Hospital. It is situated near the Ashok Vaatika square. The institution provides health care services to underprivileged population of four districts surrounding Akola.

This institution is headed by the Dean, GMCH, Akola.

History
Government Medical College, at Akola, is the first medical college in the Akola region. It was founded in 2002. The inauguration was done at the hands of the then Chief Minister, Hon. Shri. Sushil Kumar Shinde in presence of Hon. Shri. Digvijay Khanvilkar on 12 September 2003.

General
It has an intake capacity of 200 (from 2019) students each year. Mode of admission is through NEET.

The current Dean of the institution is Dr.Kusumakar. S.Ghoropade. He is acting dean. He is M.B.B.S and M.D (BIOCHEMISTRY) by qualification. 
He has been looking after the work of the Dean for the past 2 years.

The Institution provides post graduate education for the subjects of Obstetrics and Gynaecology; Dermatology and Venereal diseases; Ophthalmology; Ear, nose and throat surgery; Preventive and Social Medicine ; Pharmacology, Pathology, Microbiology.

References

External links 
 https://www.gmcakola.in/

Medical colleges in Maharashtra
Education in Akola
Educational institutions established in 2002
2002 establishments in Maharashtra
Affiliates of Maharashtra University of Health Sciences